Brian T. Taniguchi (born November 7, 1951 in Honolulu, Hawaii) is an American politician and a Democratic member of the Hawaii Senate since January 16, 2013 representing District 10. Taniguchi served consecutively from 1995 until 2013 in the District 10 and District 11 seats, having served consecutively in the Hawaii State Legislature from 1981 until 1995 in the Hawaii House of Representatives.

Taniguchi intends to retire at the end of his current term in office, and will not seek re-election in the 2022 Hawaii Senate election.

Education
Taniguchi attended University of Hawaii at Manoa and earned his JD from its William S. Richardson School of Law.

Elections
1980 Taniguchi was initially elected the Hawaii House of Representatives in the November 4, 1980 General election.
1982 Taniguchi was re-elected in the November 2, 1982 General election.
1984 Taniguchi was re-elected in the November 6, 1984 General election
1986 Taniguchi was re-elected in the November 4, 1986 General election.
1988 Taniguchi was re-elected in the November 8, 1988 General election.
1990 Taniguchi was re-elected in the November 6, 1990 General election.
1992 Taniguchi was unopposed for the House District 23 September 19, 1992 Democratic Primary, winning with 3,955 votes, and won the November 3, 1992 General election with 7,368 votes (77.4%) against Libertarian candidate Roger Taylor.
1994 Taniguchi was unopposed for the Senate District 11 September 17, 1994 Democratic Primary, winning with 7,079 votes, and won the November 8, 1994 General election with 10,357 votes (68.6%) against Republican nominee Jeff Tom.
1996 Taniguchi won the September 21, 1996 Democratic Primary with 6,369 votes (71.7%), and won the November 5, 1996 General election with 10,309 votes (69.7%) against Republican nominee John James.
2000 Taniguchi won the September 23, 2000 Democratic Primary with 6,008 votes (71.8%), and won the November 5, 2002 General election with 9,217 votes (68.8%) against Republican nominee Billy Fulton.
2002 Redistricted to District 10, and with Democratic Senator Les Ihara Jr. redistricted to District 9, Taniguchi was unopposed for the September 21, 2002 Democratic Primary, winning with 6,338 votes, and won the November 5, 2002 General election with 11,328 votes (61.1%) against Republican nominee Gladys Hayes.
2006 Taniguchi was unopposed for both the September 26, 2006 Democratic Primary, winning with 8,233 votes, and the November 7, 2006 General election.
2010 Taniguchi was unopposed for the September 18, 2010 Democratic Primary, winning with 7,778 votes, and won the November 2, 2010 General election with 10,398 votes (69.0%) against Republican nominee Eric Marshall.
2012 Redistricted back to District 11, Taniguchi directly faced fellow Democratic Senator Carol Fukunaga; Taniguchi won the August 11, 2012 Democratic Primary with 6,527 votes (52.0%), and won the November 6, 2012 General election with 15,639 votes (73.5%) against Republican nominee Larry Fenton.

State microbe legislation
In 2017 Taniguchi submitted legislation in the Hawaii Senate to make Flavobacterium akiainvivens the state microbe.  This was mirrored by Isaac Choy in the Hawaii House of Representatives.  This continues an effort started by James Tokioka in 2013, and later contested in 2014 by Senator Glenn Wakai's SB3124 bill proposing Aliivibrio fischeri instead.  , Hawaii has no official state microbe.

References

External links
Official page at the Hawaii State Legislature
 

1951 births
Living people
Hawaii lawyers
Democratic Party Hawaii state senators
Hawaii politicians of Japanese descent
Democratic Party members of the Hawaii House of Representatives
Politicians from Honolulu
University of Hawaiʻi at Mānoa alumni
21st-century American politicians
William S. Richardson School of Law alumni